Walter Ludescher (5 October 1942) is an Austrian retired footballer and coach.

References

External links
 Rapid Archiv
 Sturm Archiv

1942 births
Living people
Austrian footballers
Austrian football managers
Austria international footballers
Association football defenders
SK Rapid Wien players
FC Wacker Innsbruck players
FC Kärnten managers
SK Sturm Graz managers